Hans Leutelt (1 October 1914 – 1936) was a Czech cyclist. He competed in the individual and team road race events at the 1936 Summer Olympics.

References

External links
 

1914 births
1936 deaths
Czech male cyclists
Olympic cyclists of Czechoslovakia
Cyclists at the 1936 Summer Olympics
Place of birth missing